The 2021 K4 League is the second season of the K4 League as a semi-professional league and the fourth tier of South Korean football league system. Paju Citizen are the defending champions and was promoted together with Ulsan Citizen (the runner-up) to 2021 K3 League. Chuncheon Citizen and Jeonju Citizen were relegated from 2020 K3 League and will play in the K4 League for the first time. Icheon Citizen have disbanded due to financial problems and haven't registered for the league, while Yeoju Citizen (now Yeoju FC) has submitted a new entry in the competition after first announcing their disbandment.

Plus, four new teams, Geoje Citizen, Dangjin Citizen, Pyeongchang United (a semi-successor of former K3 League team Pyeongchang FC, disbanded in 2019) and the B team of Gangwon FC were welcomed to the K4 League.

For the first time in the history of the South Korean football system, teams from professional leagues K League 1 and K League 2 were allowed to create reserve teams set to play in the K4 League, in order to give academy players and/or other registered players more playing time. The main condition for them is to have at least seven out of eleven players in the starting formation aged 23 or younger. At the end of January 2021, it was announced that Gangwon FC would be the first club to take advantage of this new rule, having founded a reserve team that was officially allowed to take part in the 2021 edition of K4 League.

Competition format 
The 2021 K4 League is contested by sixteen teams, with no relegation system in place. Each team competes home and away, playing 30 games. The top two teams get promoted to the K3 League, while the third and the fourth placed teams qualify for the promotion play-off.

Promotion and relegation
Teams relegated from the 2020 K3 League
 Chuncheon Citizen
 Jeonju Citizen

Teams promoted to the 2021 K3 League
 Paju Citizen
 Ulsan Citizen

New Teams
 Gangwon FC B
Geoje Citizen FC
 Dangjin Citizen FC
Pyeongchang United

Name Changes
 Yeoju Citizen FC renamed to Yeoju FC

Dissolved Teams from 2020 Season
 Icheon Citizen

Teams

League table

Results

Matches 1 to 30

Promotion play-off
The match was played on the 14 November 2021. The 3rd and 4th placed team from the 2020 K4 League will play for a spot in the 2022 K3 League.

Promotion play-off
Dangjin Citizen has been promoted as a higher ranked team in the regular season.

Winner

See also
 2021 Korean FA Cup
 2021 K League 1
 2021 K League 2
 2021 K3 League
 2021 K5 League
 2021 K6 League
 2021 K7 League

References

External links

K4 League seasons
2021 in South Korean football